Eugenia León (born June 7, 1956) is a Mexican singer. A winner of the Latin Grammy Lifetime Achievement Award, she has had a career spanning more than 35 years and 26 recorded albums, of which several million copies have been sold.

She is the only Mexican to have represented her country as a singer at four consecutive World Exhibitions: Seville, Spain; Lisbon, Portugal; Hannover, Germany; and Aichi, Japan.

In 2003 she made her debut as a presenter on the arts and culture program Acústico, broadcast on Canal 22. Eugenia León has shared the stage with personalities such as Rosario Flores, Pablo Milanés, Marco Antonio Muñiz, Lila Downs, Chavela Vargas, Sin Bandera, José Feliciano, Gilberto Santa Rosa, Armando Manzanero, Los de Abajo, Ramón Vargas, Tania Libertad, and Guadalupe Pineda. Over the years, several musical celebrities, such as Ramón Vargas, Fito Páez, Mercedes Sosa, Willie Colón, and Armando Manzanero have praised her qualities as a singer.

In 2016, she received a gold record with Tania Libertad and Guadalupe Pineda for the high sales of their successful project Las Tres Grandes en , awarded by Sony Music. They went on a promotional tour with full concerts throughout Mexico, at venues such as the Auditorio Nacional in Mexico City, the TelMex Auditorium in Guadalajara, and the Auditorio Banamex in Monterrey. This CD/DVD album received a nomination at the 17th Latin Grammy Awards, in the Best Long Version Music Video category.

Biography

Early years

At age 18, she decided to leave home to complete her education at the UNAM National School of Music.

Career
With the support of her sister, León founded the Víctor Jara group, which was dedicated to Latin American folk music. She later joined the group , composed of Mexican and Argentine musicians and singers, directed by Naldo Labrín, from which she decided to emerge individually in 1982, building a repertoire made up of pieces by contemporary Mexican composers, playing bolero and Brazilian music.

She released her first album in 1983, Así te quiero, and toured the Mexican Republic, accompanied by a small group of musicians.

Eugenia won first place, but there was no time to celebrate, give interviews, or sign contracts, because a devastating earthquake struck Mexico City the day before the final stage of the festival.

León has recorded more than 20 albums. Some composers whose works she have interpreted are Fito Páez, Joan Manuel Serrat, Marcial Alejandro, Armando Manzanero, José Alfredo Jiménez, Francisco Gabilondo Soler, and María Grever. She has performed in various genres such as mariachi, bolero, and tango.

In 1998, the government of Veracruz presented her with the Agustín Lara medal, in recognition of her interpretations of the composer from that state.

She worked with Pablo Milanés during the Cómplices tour, covering a large part of the Mexican Republic. She also worked with Mexican tenor Ramón Vargas during the production of the album Corazón Mexicano, sponsored by the Government of the Federal District.

In 2003, she began hosting the television program Acústico on Mexico City Canal 22, where she interviewed Ibero-American music personalities.

Commemorating her 20 years as a performer, Eugenia León gave a concert at the Auditorio Nacional on November 1, 2003, accompanied by Mariachi Vargas and the Symphony Orchestra of the Americas.

She has given international performances in France, Japan, New York, Seville, Cartagena, Germany, Brazil, Morocco, Beijing, and Egypt.

In 2008, León participated as a guest artist in a Mexican special entitled Fiesta Mexicana for the US cultural television network PBS, along with Vikki Carr, and the mariachi group Los Camperos de Nati Cano. She was honored by the municipal government of Tlalnepantla as a favorite daughter of the municipality at the 2008 Equinoccio Festival.

That year she ventured into acting in the film Tear This Heart Out, based on the acclaimed novel by Ángeles Mastretta. She played Toña la Negra, sharing credits with Ana Claudia Talancón, Daniel Giménez Cacho, and José María de Tavira.

León appeared at the opening of the Pan American Games in Guadalajara on October 14, 2011.

Discography

Groups
 Grupo Víctor Jara, Vamos Patria, Polygram 1978
 , A Pesar De Todo, NCL 1981

Soloist
 Así te quiero, Polygram 1983
 Luz, Polygram 1984
 El Fandango Aquí, Polygram 1985
 Otra vez, Polygram 1986
 Algo viene sucediendo, Polygram 1987
 Maradentro, Polygram 1988
 Ven acá, Polygram 1989
 Lo esencial, Universal Music 1989
 Juego con fuego, BMG 1991
 Eugenia corazón de león, BMG 1993
 Eugenia León interpreta a Cri-Cri, BMG 1994
 Tangos, La Voz De La Sirena 1995
 Que devuelvan, Ediciones El Hábitos-Discos Cabaret 1996
 Tirana, Sony Music 1996
 Oh, noche, Ediciones El Hábitos-Discos Cabaret 1996
 Eugenia León en Directo, Discos Cabaret 1996
 Norteño, Melody 1998
 Corazón mexicano, Gobierno De La Ciudad De México 1998
 La suave Patria, Opción Sónica 1999
 Ni esto, ni l'otro, La Voz De La Sirena 1999
 Acércate más, Universal Music 2000
 Tatuajes, Universal Music 2003
 Ellas Cantan Así, BMG 2003
 La Más Completa Colección, Universal Music 2006
 Pasional, IC21 2007
 Puño de tierra, IC21 2008
 Cine, IC21 2009
 Agua de Beber, Universal Music 2011
 Ciudadana del Mundo Vol. 1, Universal Music 2013
 Ciudadana del Mundo Vol. 2, Universal Music 2013
 Las Tres Grandes en Primera Fila together with Tania Libertad and Guadalupe Pineda, Sony Music 2015
 Una Rosa Encendida, Sony Music 2017

Collaborations
 México 68 Vol. 1, IMM 1968
 Amparo Ochoa Canta Con Los Niños, Discos Pueblo 1984
 Está Valiendo... El Corazón, 1987
 Canciones del Íntimo Decoro, Pentagrama 1988
 Entre Amigos, BMG 1993
 30 Años, BMG 1993
 Boleros, Voz Y Sentimiento, Sony Music 1996
 Un Mundo Una Esperanza, 1998
 Un Canto De México, Sony Music 2002
 Pablo Queriido, Universal Music 2003
 Angeles y Pequeños Diablitos, 2003
 El Pop Ha Muerto Viva El Pop, Universal Music 2005
 Reunidos Por Siempre, Universal Music 2005
 Chava Flores: Tributo De Sus Amigos, 2006
 Buenas Noches, Sony Music 2006
 5x5=, 2006
 Quemar Las Naves, 2008
 La Morena, Fonarte 2008
 Sin Fecha De Caducidad, WEA 2009
 Huapanguenado, 2009
 Por Mi Culpa, WEA 2010
 Tengo Que Hablarte, Pnetagrama 2010
 Zona Preferente: En Vivo Desde El Auditorio Nacional, WEA 2012
 33, 2013
 Zona Preferente: Mi Tributo Al Festival, WEA 2013
 Necesito Un Bolero, Sony Music 2014
 Mujer Divina, Sony Music 2014
 Caricia Urgente, 2015
 He for She, Sony Music 2015
 Rocío Dúrcal, Duetos, Sony Music 2016
 La Sonora Santanera en Su 60 Aniversario, Sony Music 2016
 Amar y Vivir'', Universal Music 2017

References

External links
 

1956 births
Living people
Mexico in the OTI Festival
National Autonomous University of Mexico alumni
People from Tlalnepantla de Baz
Singers from the State of Mexico
Latin Grammy Lifetime Achievement Award winners
20th-century Mexican women singers
21st-century Mexican women singers
Mexican women television presenters
Women in Latin music